Arshia Asudeh, known as Ash Asudeh, is a Canadian linguist specialising in semantics, syntax and cognitive science, and based at Carleton University and the University of Oxford; in 2016, the latter awarded him the title of Professor of Semantics.

Life 
Ash Asudeh graduated from Carleton University with a Bachelor of Arts degree in cognitive science in 1996, before completing a two-year MPhil at the University of Edinburgh with a thesis entitled Anaphora and argument structure: topics in the syntax and semantics of reflexives and reciprocals. Between 1998 and 2004, he completed a PhD at the Department of Linguistics at Stanford University, successfully defending a thesis on Resumption as resource management. For the following academic year, he lectured at the University of Canterbury, Christchurch; he was an assistant professor (2006–10) and then associate professor (since 2010) at Carleton University. In 2011, he took up a post as lecturer at the University of Oxford's Faculty of Linguistics, Philology and Phonetics, and joined Jesus College, Oxford, as a fellow. In 2016, the University of Oxford awarded him the title of Professor of Semantics.

Research 
Asudeh's research focuses on semantics, pragmatics, syntax, cognitive science, computational linguistics, language and logic. His published works include:
 Joan Bresnan, Ash Asudeh, Ida Toivonen, and Stephen Wechsler, Lexical-Functional Syntax, 2nd ed. (Wiley-Blackwell, 2016). 
 Ash Asudeh and Ida Toivonen, "With Lexical Integrity", Theoretical Linguistics, vol. 40, issues 1–2 (2014), pp. 175–186.
 Ash Asudeh, Mary Dalrymple and Ida Toivonen, "Constructions with Lexical Integrity", Journal of Language Modelling, vol. 1, issue 1 (2013), pp. 1–54.
 Ash Asudeh and Ida Toivonen, "Copy raising and perception", Natural Language and Linguistic Theory, vol. 30, issue 2 (2012), pp. 321–380.
 Ash Asudeh, The Logic of Pronominal Resumption (Oxford University Press, 2012).

References 

Year of birth missing (living people)
Living people
Carleton University alumni
Alumni of the University of Edinburgh
Stanford University School of Humanities and Sciences alumni
Fellows of Jesus College, Oxford
Linguists from Canada